Singori ( Kumaoni: सिङ्गौड़ी) or  Singauri is an Indian sweet from Kumaon made with Khoya and wrapped in maalu leaf (Bauhinia variegata). It is similar to Kalakhand.

History
According to some historians the origin of Singori is believed to be the old province of Almora. It is traditionally made with khoya wrapped in form of a cone with Maalu leaves.

The dessert is prepared from Khoya and served wrapped like a cone in Molu leaf.

Singori/Singodi is a cone shaped sweet exclusively available in the Kumaon region of India.

See also

 Kumaoni cuisine
 Bal Mithai

References

Confectionery
Indian desserts